Phoma exigua var. linicola is a fungal plant pathogen that affects flax.

The disease is passed on in the seed. The effects are more pronounced after the plant has flowered. Brown discolorations can be seen with small black dots, the pycnidia, where the spores are formed. The disease severely impacts the fiber quality.

References

External links 
 Index Fungorum
 USDA ARS Fungal Database

Fungal plant pathogens and diseases
Fiber plant diseases
Phoma
Fungi described in 1965